Catherine McCabe Zimmerman (born January 15, 1994) is an American soccer forward who plays for W-League side Melbourne Victory.

Early life and collegiate career
Zimmerman played for Madison High School, scoring 50 goals and notching 25 assists. In four years at Madison, she earned several accolades and honours. She was included in the First Team All-County in 2010 and All-Conference (2010–11). She was also named First Team All-State (2010–11), Morris County Player of the Year (2011) and Star Ledger Player of the Year (2011). Zimmerman then went to Providence College. Her freshman year was a little slow as she only played 10 matches for the Friars. Nevertheless, she managed to score 7 goals and notched on assist, leading the team in points (15). In the following 3 years, Zimmerman became a key player for Providence, leading the team in points and goals in each of the years. Because of her performance, Zimmerman was named for the BIG EAST All-Tournament team, All-BIG EAST First Team honors and was also chosen the 2015 BIG EAST All-Tournament Most Outstanding Offensive Player.

Club career

NWSL

After an outstanding career at college, Zimmerman declared herself for the 2016 NWSL College Draft, but she was not picked by any team. However, her college coach, had a good relationship with Western New York Flash's coach Paul Riley and he managed to get her an invitation to the Flash's preseason camp in Rochester, New York. She began training with Flash, but continued her college education. Zimmerman was included in the Western New York Flash's official roster for the 2016 season, but after not getting to play any minute for the Rochester team, she made the decision to put her career on hold and pursue a graduation.

Back to home at New Jersey, Zimmerman used her contacts to earn a place in the Sky Blue Reserves. On July 1, 2016, with several attacking players cut from the squad for injury problems, the team made the decision to waive GK Erin Nayler to make room and officially signed with Zimmerman. On July 2, she debuted for the SBFC. Zimmerman started and played 73 minutes of the match against the Portland Thorns. She, then, started four of the five matches she played for SBFC until July 31, when Zimmerman suffered an injury after colliding with Estelle Johnson in the 25th minute of the match against Washington Spirit.

NPLW

Zimmerman signed for Australian National Premier Leagues Victoria Women side Calder United SC in 2018. In her debut with Calder, Zimmerman scored both goals in her club's FFV Women's Community Shield 2–1 victory over South Melbourne FC. Calder finished in 2nd place in the 2018 NPL Victoria Women season and Zimmerman finished as the league's Golden Boot winner, with 43 goals in 28 games. The following season, United won the treble, taking out the Nike Cup, league premiership and league championship. Zimmerman scored 33 goals in 27 league games, again winning both the league Golden Boot and Gold Medal award.

W-League

In October 2020, Zimmerman signed with W-League side Melbourne Victory.

References

External links
 
 Player's Profile at Providence College 

1994 births
Living people
NJ/NY Gotham FC players
Western New York Flash players
Melbourne Victory FC (A-League Women) players
Soccer players from New Jersey
National Women's Soccer League players
American women's soccer players
Women's association football forwards
People from Madison, New Jersey
Sportspeople from Morris County, New Jersey
Providence Friars women's soccer players
Madison High School (New Jersey) alumni
American expatriate women's soccer players
Expatriate women's soccer players in Australia
American expatriate sportspeople in Australia